The Château de Tustal is an historic castle in Sadirac, Gironde, Aquitaine, France.

History
The castle was built in 1614, with additional constructions added in the 18th and 19th centuries.

Architectural significance
It has been listed as an official monument since 2008.

References

Châteaux in Gironde
Monuments historiques of Gironde